The Kitten's Joy Stakes is a Grade III American Thoroughbred horse race for horses three years old at the distance of one and one-sixteenths mile on the turf held annually in late January or early February at Gulfstream Park, Hallandale Beach, Florida.  The event currently carries a purse of $175,000.

History 
The race was inaugurated in 2012 over the distance of  miles after Kitten's Joy who was a multiple graded stakes winner and the 2004 American Champion Turf Horse.  Kitten's Joy also won the Grade III Palm Beach Stakes at Gulfstream Park where this race is held.

The event was shortened in one mile in 2015 and once again in 2018 to the current distance of about  furlongs.

In 2020 the event was upgraded to a Grade III.

In 2021 the distance of the event was increased to 1 mile.

The 2013 winner Charming Kitten and the 2017 winner Kitten's Cat were both sired by Kitten's Joy. Also both winners were owned Kenneth L. and Sarah K. Ramsey who also owned Kitten's Joy.

In 2022 the distance of the event was increased again to  miles.

Records
Speed record: 
 1 mile – 1:35.18 – Chess's Dream (2021)
 about  furlongs – 1:28.25   –  Island Commish  (2020)

Margins: 
  lengths –  	Howe Great   (2012) 
 
Most wins by a jockey
 3 – John R. Velazquez   (2013, 2015, 2019)

Most wins by a trainer
 3 – Todd A. Pletcher   (2013, 2022, 2023)

Most wins by an owner 
 2 –  Kenneth L. and Sarah K. Ramsey (2013, 2017)

Winners

See also
List of American and Canadian Graded races

External links
 2020–21 Gulfstream Park Media Guide

References 

Turf races in the United States
Recurring sporting events established in 2012
Horse races in the United States
Graded stakes races in the United States
2012 establishments in Florida
Horse races in Florida
Flat horse races for three-year-olds
Grade 3 stakes races in the United States
Hallandale Beach, Florida